The Bringhi or Brengi river is a river in Anantnag, Jammu and Kashmir, India. It flows for a total of  before feeding Jhelum River at Haji Danter, Anantnag. It is formed by the confluence of three streams Nowbugh stream, Ahlan Gadol Stream, and Daksum Stream. Nowbugh Stream originates from the glaciers of Margan Top, 
Daksum Stream originates from the glaciers of Sinthan in Anantnag district. The river passes through a gorge at Daksum (altitude ). Kokernag is in the Bringhi river valley. It is one of the tributary of river Jhelum. Sir Walter Lawrence wrote in his book The Valley of Kashmir that the brang river which disappears at Dewalgam village in the fissures of the limestone is the real source of the Achabal spring. Recently a sink hole appeared in the river at wandevelgam which sucked in the whole flow of the water. This is the second time a sink hole has appeared in this river.

References

Rivers of Jammu and Kashmir
Rivers of India